The Union of Republican Forces (UFR) is a liberal political party in Guinea.

Founded in 1992, the party has been led since 1999 by the former Prime Minister of Guinea Sidya Touré. The party supported the 2007 general strike.

Touré finished in third place in both the 2010 and 2015 presidential elections, with vote shares of 15.6% and 6.0%, respectively.

References

External links
Official website 

Political parties established in 1992
Political parties in Guinea
Liberal International
Liberal parties in Africa